The 2007 Super Series was an eight-game Under-20 ice hockey challenge between Russia and Canada. The series was won by Canada, who shocked the Russians with seven wins and one tie (there was no overtime in this series). Over the course of the eight games, Canada outscored Russia 39-13. The Series was held from August 27 to September 9 in various venues in both countries. The event commemorated the 35th anniversary of the 1972 Summit Series between the USSR and Canada.

It was reported on March 28, 2007 in a Moscow-based daily newspaper that Russian prime minister Mikhail Fradkov was keen for a third Summit Series to mark the 35th anniversary of the original 1972 series. According to the paper, Fradkov called upon Canadian prime minister Stephen Harper to support consideration for another Summit Series. Journalist Vsevolod Kukushkin, an interpreter for the Soviet team in the 1972 series, reported that the first to suggest a new Series was Hockey Canada president Bob Nicholson. Kukushkin wrote in his article:

In Nicholson's opinion the situation is very good now for such a series. Since the 1972 series, which was one of the most important sports events of the last century, a generation of players and fans have come and gone ... and a new generation of fans and players in both countries deserve to see such a great product.

Canada raised some eyebrows in Russia when head coach Brent Sutter had all his players 'run the gauntlet' during a practice before the first game.

The first four games were played in Russia where Canada won all four games, and the next four games were in Canada where the Canadian team had three wins and tied the Russians in the seventh game.

The Super Series' Most Valuable Player and leading scorer was Canada's Sam Gagner. Canada's Kyle Turris was the top goal scorer in the series.

Ufa Arena fog issues 
There were issues with fog on the ice during some of the games in Russia. The rinks used were very new, and some issues with the air conditioning still needed to be worked out. When the fog got severe, the on ice officials would have the players skate around the rink during stoppages in play to attempt to disperse the fog. This caused some issues, when Canada's Brad Marchand took a misconduct penalty while skating around his zone.

Schedule

Team records 
Russia: 0 W - 7 L - 1 T
Canada: 7 W - 0 L - 1 T

Game summaries

Game one

Game summary 
The Russians got off to a flying start, as the Canadians seemed sluggish to begin the series, turning the puck over in the neutral zone many times early in the first period. Viacheslav Solodukhin of Russia scored the first goal of the tournament, giving the home team a 1-0 lead at 6:46. Alexander Ryabev made the game 2-0 with a power play goal three minutes and 13 seconds later, on a shot that could have been easily stopped by Canadian goalie Steve Mason. Canada's Stefan Legein replied at 15:47 to make it 2-1 Russia with a slap shot right through the wickets of Russian goaltender Semyon Varlamov. Kyle Turris scored on a penalty shot 41 seconds after that, after being tripped on a two-on-one.

Canada opened the scoring in the second period, when Brad Marchand bulged the twine 58 seconds in on a nice play set up by Sam Gagner. They made it 4-2 with 1:10 left in the period when Gagner scored after making a great play behind the net to bring it out front and slide it through the Russian goalie.

In the third period, Canada was able to hold on to the lead despite taking another five penalties to add to their high penalty count. The penalty kill was led by the strong play of coach Brent Sutter's son, Brandon.

Also contributing to the win was the solid play of Mason, who bounced back from giving up two early goals and finished the game with a total of 40 saves. Canada's penalty kill played extremely well, holding the Russians to only one power play goal on a shocking 13 power-play opportunities and leaving them scoreless on two 5-on-3s.

Karl Alzner was named player of the game for Canada.

Scoring summary

Game two

Game summary 
Both sides switched their goaltenders for the second game. Canada opted for Jonathan Bernier, while Russia went with Sergei Bobrovsky. Canada was the home team in game two, allowing coach Brent Sutter to make the last change and get the line match-ups he wanted. About ten minutes into the game, Brandon Sutter delivered a devastating hit to Russian star Alexei Cherepanov, as the Russian tried to cut into the middle of the Canadian zone. Cherepanov suffered a concussion and would not return in the series. Sutter's hit set the tone for the Canadians and started what would become a chippy affair. On a Canadian power play later in the first period, Kyle Turris finished off a give-and-go with David Perron with a nifty backhand upstairs into the Russian goal.

As the second period began, fog began to become a factor in the game. The newly opened Ufa Arena did not have air conditioning, and because of the heat, a thick cloud of fog formed on the ice. Both teams were sent to skate around to try to clear the fog. The Canadians dominated the second period physically, very much due to Canada's checking line of Sutter, Legein, and Lucic. They smothered Cherepanov all game long, and also chipped in with a goal by Legein in the final minute of the second, one-timing a pass from Sutter.

Canada dominated the third as well, despite having to delay the game again to try to clear the fog. The game continued to be a heated affair, as there were scrums after many whistles, resulting in penalties for both teams. With 2:01 left, David Perron scored a terrific goal, as he dangled the Russian defender, then using a spin move and backhanding the puck through his legs into the net.

Jonathan Bernier earned the shutout in the 3-0 win.

Scoring summary

Game three

Game summary 
Leland Irving got the start for Team Canada as the Super Series moved to Omsk for games three and four. Canada's powerplay was very effective, scoring four goals on nine chances. Semyon Varlamov started the game for the Russian squad, but was replaced after the first intermission by Vadim Zhelobnyuk. The game was closer than the final score indicated, as the Canadians only led by a goal heading into the third.

Scoring summary

Game four

Game summary 
Brad Marchand opened the scoring in the final stages of the first period to give Canada a 1-0 lead. In the second period, Sam Gagner scored a goal and an assist on John Tavares' first goal of the series.

Facing a 3-0 deficit in the third period, Russia scored two quick goals in 36 seconds to open the final frame, cutting the lead down to one. Brent Sutter called a timeout after the two Russian goals and Marchand scored his second goal of the game on the next shift to halt the comeback.

The final score was 4-2 as Canada swept the first leg of the series in Russia.

Scoring summary

Game five

Scoring summary

Game six

Scoring summary

Game seven

Scoring summary

Game eight

Scoring summary

Leading scorers

Goaltenders

Rosters

Canada 

Head coach: Brent Sutter
Assistant coaches: Benoit Groulx, Peter DeBoer

Russia 

Head coach: Sergei Nemchinov
Assistant coaches: Vladimir Popov, Yuri Leonov

See also 

 Super Series
 1972 Summit Series
 1974 Summit Series
 2007 in ice hockey
 IIHF World U20 Championship
 2008 World Junior Ice Hockey Championships
 2012 Canada–Russia Challenge

References

External links 
 Super Series info: CHL Prospects Insider
 Website at Hockey Canada

Sport in Ufa
Sport in Omsk
International ice hockey competitions hosted by Russia
International ice hockey competitions hosted by Canada
Canada–Russia relations
super
super
2007
Super Series